Aaron Rene Doornekamp (born December 5, 1985) is a Canadian-Dutch professional basketball player for Iberostar Tenerife of the Liga ACB. He was one of the greatest players in the history of the Carleton University Ravens men's college basketball team. Doornekamp is also a member of the senior Canadian men's national team.

University career
Doornekamp was named CIS Men's Basketball Player of the year, and OUA Male Athlete of the Year, in 2008. He was a member of the Carleton Ravens Canadian national championship teams in 2005, 2006, 2007, and 2009, and he won the MVP award at the 2007 final eight tournament.

Professional career
After finishing his college career, Doornekamp signed his first pro contract in Italy, with Pepsi Caserta. He played three years with the club. While sidelined with injury in the 2012–13 season, Doornekamp was the assistant coach of the McMaster Marauders men's basketball team.

In August 2013, he signed with the New Yorker Phantoms Braunschweig, from Braunschweig, Germany. In June 2014, he parted ways with them.

On June 29, 2014, he signed with the German club Skyliners Frankfurt, for the 2014–15 season. He won the European-wide third-tier level FIBA Europe Cup's 2015–16 season championship with the team.

In June 2016, Doornekamp left Germany, to sign with the Spanish team Iberostar Tenerife. He won the Basketball Champions League's 2016–17 season championship with the team. He was also named to the BCL Star Lineup Best Team. On June 27, 2017, Doornekamp officially opted out of his contract with the Spanish team. The same day, he signed a two-year contract with Valencia Basket. On July 8, 2019, Doornekamp re-signed with Valencia Basket for another season. He signed with Iberostar Tenerife on July 15, 2020.

National team career
Doornekamp was a member of the junior national teams of Canada. With Canada's junior national team, he played at the 2005 FIBA Under-21 World Championship, where he won a bronze medal. He has also been a member of the senior men's Canadian national basketball team.

With Canada's senior team, he played at the following tournaments: the 2007 Pan American Games, the 2008 FIBA Olympic Qualifying Tournament, the 2009 FIBA Americas Championship, the 2010 FIBA World Championship, the 2011 FIBA Americas Championship, the 2013 FIBA Americas Championship, and the 2020 FIBA Olympic Qualifying Tournament. He also played at the 2015 Pan American Games, where he won a silver medal, and the 2015 FIBA Americas Championship, where he won a bronze medal.

Personal
Doornekamp was married on July 13, 2013, in Burlington, Ontario, to Jasmyn Richardson. The couple has two children.

References

External links
 Euroleague.net Profile
 FIBA Profile (archive)
 FIBA Profile (game center)
 FIBA Europe Profile
 Eurobasket.com Profile
 Draftexpress.com Profile
 Spanish League Profile 
 Italian League Profile 
 Profile at carleton.ca

1985 births
Living people
2010 FIBA World Championship players
Basketball Löwen Braunschweig players
Basketball people from Ontario
Basketball players at the 2007 Pan American Games
Basketball players at the 2015 Pan American Games
Canadian expatriate basketball people in Italy
Canadian expatriate basketball people in Spain
Canadian expatriate basketball people in Germany
Canadian men's basketball players
Canadian people of Dutch descent
Carleton Ravens basketball players
CB Canarias players
Dutch expatriate basketball people in Spain
Dutch men's basketball players
Juvecaserta Basket players
Liga ACB players
Medalists at the 2015 Pan American Games
Pan American Games medalists in basketball
Pan American Games silver medalists for Canada
People from Lennox and Addington County
Power forwards (basketball)
Shooting guards
Small forwards
Skyliners Frankfurt players
Valencia Basket players